This is a list of elections in Canada in 2005. Included are provincial, municipal and  federal elections, by-elections on any level, referendums and party leadership races at any level.

May
17: British Columbia general election
17: British Columbia electoral reform referendum
24: By-elections to the 38th Canadian Parliament

September
23-25: New Brunswick New Democratic Party leadership election
27: Newfoundland and Labrador municipal elections

November
6: Bedford municipal election
6: Bromont municipal election
6: Cowansville municipal election
6: Magog municipal election
13: Parti Québécois leadership election
18-19: Alberta Alliance Party leadership election
19: Vancouver municipal election
28: Prince Edward Island electoral reform referendum

See also
Municipal elections in Canada
Elections in Canada

 
Political timelines of the 2000s by year